2005 in professional wrestling describes the year's events in the world of professional wrestling.

List of notable promotions 
These promotions held notable shows in 2005.

Calendar of notable shows

January

February

March

April

May

June

July

August

September

October

November

December

Accomplishments and tournaments

AAA

Ring of Honor

TNA

TNA Year End Awards

WWE

WWE Hall of Fame

Awards and honors

Pro Wrestling Illustrated

Wrestling Observer Newsletter

Wrestling Observer Newsletter Hall of Fame

Wrestling Observer Newsletter awards

Title changes

NJPW

TNA

WWE 
 – Raw
 – SmackDown

Raw and SmackDown each had a world championship, a secondary championship, and a tag team championship for male wrestlers. SmackDown also had a title for their cruiserweight wrestlers. There was only one women's championship and it was exclusive to Raw.

Debuts
Uncertain debut date
Ashley Massaro
Epico Colón
Fenix
Killian Dain/Big Damo
Seth Rollins/Tyler Black
Paige
Xavier Woods
 January 4 – Antonio Honda
 March 6 – Ram Kaicho
 May 1 – Aoi Kizuki
 May 15 – Violento Jack
 August 14 – Guanchulo
 November 4 – Serena
 December 3 – Takoyakida
 December 23 – Kankuro Hoshino

Retirements
 Wendi Richter (1979–2005)
 Joy Giovanni (2004–2005)
 Metal Maniac (November 1991 – 2005)
 Ron Reis (1994-2005) 
 Rochelle Loewen (2003-2005) 
 Lauren Jones (2004-2005) 
 Nathan Jones (11 October 1997 – 2005)
 Nidia (2001–2005)
 Tony Anthony (1980-2005) 
 Colonel DeBeers (1972-January 29, 2005)
 Amy Weber (November 18, 2004 – February 2005)
 Molly Holly (August 2, 1997 – April 14, 2005) (since then has made occasional appreances)
 Rico Constantino (1998 – July 2005) (although he had been fully inactive from in-ring competition since 2005, he briefly returned to have his full retirement match in 2012)
 Muhammad Hassan (2002 – September 21, 2005)

Deaths 

 January 18 – Pez Whatley, 54
 April 21 – Black Angus Campbell, 70
 April 28 – Chris Candido, 33
 May 12 – The Matador, 76
 May 28 – Daniel Quirk, 22
 July 11 – Shinya Hashimoto, 40
 July 16 – Miguel Perez Sr., 68
 July 16 – Rod Trongard, 72
 July 21 – Lord Alfred Hayes, 76
 August 8 – Dean Rockwell, 93
 August 13 – Chris Tolos, 75
 August 15 – Peter Smit, 43
 August 18 – Chri$ Ca$h, 23
 August 26 – Sailor White, 56
 September 9 – Tarzan Taborda, 70
 September 23 – Gene Stanlee, 88
 October 22 – The Crusher, 79
 October 22 – Franky Gee, 43
 November 13 – Eddie Guerrero, 38

See also
List of TNA pay-per-view events
List of WWE pay-per-view events

References

 
professional wrestling